RAF Tempsford is a former Royal Air Force station located  north east of Sandy, Bedfordshire, England and  south of St. Neots, Cambridgeshire, England.

As part of the Royal Air Force Special Duty Service, the airfield was perhaps the most secret airfield of the Second World War. It was home to 138 (Special Duty) Squadron and 161 (Special Duty) Squadron, which dropped supplies and agents into occupied Europe for the Special Operations Executive (SOE). 138 (SD) Squadron did the bulk of the supply and agent drops, while 161 (SD) Squadron had the Lysander flight, and did the insertion and pick-up operations in occupied Europe.

RAF Tempsford is very close to Little Gransden Airfield and can be clearly seen from flights climbing out from the westerly runway 28. Other active airfields nearby include the former RAF bases at Gransden Lodge and Bourn.

Units

Tempsford now

By 2002 part of the former Tempsford airfield was a concrete-making facility and some of the main airfield buildings had been turned into various commercial workshops. A nearby public footpath led to the end of a substantially intact runway and then on to Gibraltar Farm, the agents' final dispatch point.

This barn contains several plaques and memorials to the agents, both men and women, who were flown from the airfield, many of whom were later killed after being captured and tortured.  A memorial is also to be found in St Peter's Church, in the nearby village of Tempsford, and the Tempsford Memorial is outside the church, commemorating the men and women who served as secret agents in occupied Europe during the Second World War and the RAF aircrew who transported them.

Tempsford Museum & Archives in the village of Tempsford houses a vast collection of photographs, papers, maps, uniforms and aircraft parts associated with RAF Tempsford.

People
Andrée Borrel and Lise de Baissac (Odile) were the first female SOE agents to be parachuted into occupied France. They flew out from RAF Tempsford on 24 September 1942.
Flying Officer Gerald Cruwys was awarded the Croix de Guerre for his work with the French Resistance while at RAF Tempsford.
Group Captain Edward 'Mouse' Fielden, Station Commander of RAF Tempsford (1942-1944) and a former royal pilot.
Air Chief Marshal Sir Lewis Macdonald Hodges was the Commander of 161 Squadron from May 1943 to 1944.
Group Captain Percy Charles Pickard was awarded a second bar to his DSO in March 1943 for his outstanding leadership in command of 161 Squadron.
Group Captain Hugh Verity, author of We Landed by Moonlight.
Violette Szabo GC of the SOE flew on her first mission into France from RAF Tempsford.
Wing Commander F. F. E. Yeo-Thomas, otherwise known as the White Rabbit, was dropped into France on 27 February 1943 having been flown out from RAF Tempsford by Pilot Officer Foster.

References

Citations

Bibliography
 Clark, F. Agents by Moonlight: The Secret History of RAF Tempsford during the Second World War. Stroud: Tempus Publishing Ltd., 1999.
 Clark, F. Peter Five. Bromley: Independent Books, 1993.
 Griffiths, Frank "Winged Hours". London: William Kimber, 1981. .

 O'Connor, B. Tempsford Airfield: Now the story can be told…  1998.  
 Verity, H., We Landed By Moonlight (revised edition). Manchester: Crecy Publishing, 2000. .

External links

 MOD site for Tempsford - Details about Tempsford on the Bomber Command section of the MOD website.
  RAF Tempsford Special Duties Squadrons  RAF Tempsford Special Duties Squadrons.
 Tempsford Airfield - A non-commercial website about the secret wartime activities of this R.A.F. airfield in Bedfordshire, England
  Final Flight of Hudson FK790 - In memory of F/Lt J W Menzies DFC, his crew and agents.
 Wartime Memories Project - Recollections from the war years.
 A History of RAF Tempsford - A chronology of some of the main events at RAF Tempsford.
 RAF Tempsford Roll of Honour
 RAF history of 138 Squadron
 RAF history of 161 Squadron
 A walking tour of the Airfield and Gibraltar Farm in 2002
 A look at the memorials in Tempsford Church

Royal Air Force stations in Bedfordshire
Royal Air Force stations of World War II in the United Kingdom
Special Operations Executive